Zbigniew Szczepkowski (4 May 1952 – 4 February 2019) was a Polish cyclist. He competed in the team pursuit event at the 1976 Summer Olympics.

He was buried in Nowogard in Zachodniopomorskie Voivodeship.

References

External links
 

1952 births
2019 deaths
Polish male cyclists
Olympic cyclists of Poland
Cyclists at the 1976 Summer Olympics
People from Nowogard
Sportspeople from West Pomeranian Voivodeship
Presidential Cycling Tour of Turkey winners